Malibu, CA is an American teen sitcom produced by Peter Engel that aired from October 11, 1998, to May 20, 2000, in syndication. Co-created by Engel and Carl Kurlander, the show centred on the lives of twin brothers Scott (Trevor Merszei) and Jason Collins (Jason Hayes), who move to Malibu, California from New York City to live with their father, Peter (Edward Blatchford).

Guest appearances on the show included Dennis Haskins (who had previously worked with Engel for several years on Saved by the Bell), Scott Whyte and Marissa Dyan from City Guys, Daniella Deutscher and Dick Butkus from Hang Time, Josh Holland and Kristen Miller from USA High, and model Victoria Silvstedt.

The series was one of two post–Saved by the Bell: The College Years programs executively produced by Peter Engel that did not air on NBC's TNBC lineup, USA High being the other. Prior to the 2012 premiere of The First Family, Malibu, CA was the last situation comedy to be broadcast in the United States for the first-run syndication market.

Characters
 Scott Collins (Trevor Merszei) – Scott moves to Malibu from New York City with his twin brother Jason after their mother takes a job in Saudi Arabia, forcing them to live with their father. Scott is a competitive swimmer and dreams of being a sports broadcaster. Just like his twin brother, he is also girl hungry. In the first season, Scott and Jason often break the fourth wall to address the audience.
 Jason Collins (Jason Hayes) – Jason is Scott's twin brother who moves out to Malibu with him from New York City. Jason's main interest is girls, and he tries to get a date whenever possible, even if it means hurting other people along the way. He harbours dreams of being a world-famous guitarist and songwriter.
 Peter Collins (Edward Blatchford) – Scott and Jason's father and the owner of The Lighthouse, a restaurant in Malibu. He is more laid-back than the boys' mother and is always there for them, but will not tolerate misbehaviour.
 Murray Updyke (Brandon Brooks) – The unacknowledged son of a wealthy oil baron, Murray is an off-beat surfer who runs The Surf Shack, a beachfront establishment where surfers can rent boards and other paraphernalia that Peter later buys. Though a bit of an idiot savant. Murray is a true friend.
 Jennifer "Stads" Stadler (Wendi Kenya; Season 1, and select episodes of Season 2) – Stads is a blonde, athletic, tomboyish lifeguard at the beach. She is insulted when people think she is a bimbo and is hot-tempered when dealing with people who call her one. Initially smitten with Scott, she ends up with Jason. Their relationship is fraught with constant fighting because Stads usually beats Jason at everything, and they eventually break up after Jason kisses Stads' best friend Samantha during a storm. They reconcile, but Stads takes a job in Europe and breaks up with Jason again after she learns he is seeing someone else.
 Samantha "Sam" Chapman (Gina Marie May; Season 1 only) – An attractive brunette who is Stads' best friend and the next-door neighbour of Scott, Jason, and Peter. Scott and Jason initially vie for her affections, but Scott wins out and Jason begins a relationship with Stads. When Scott's ex-girlfriend Megan comes to town, he has an affair with her, causing Samantha to break up with him. Samantha is an environmental activist who protests drilling for oil at the beach and the construction of condominia which threaten the existence of The Surf Shack, run by her childhood friend Murray. She also briefly tries her hand at modeling and almost leaves for Paris with a photographer of dubious moral character before Scott convinces her to change her mind. Samantha later moves back to the East Coast to attend college.
 Traycee Banks (Priscilla Lee Taylor; recurring character in Season 1, promoted to main cast in Season 2) – A gorgeous blonde who is a stereotypical bimbo. Traycee owns an enormous amount of swimwear, loves the colour pink, and is an actress. She initially lives in her own place but moves into an apartment with Lisa, which she names Casa de Fun Fun. She gets a job working as Dr. Sheila Lowenstein on the soap opera Malibu Hospital, but after the show is cancelled she decides to go to medical school. Like Murray, Traycee is not very bright and sometimes annoying, but she is a good friend. Her beauty often attracts many men to her, which her friends sometimes use to their advantage.
 Lisa Jones (Marquita Terry; Season 2 only) – Lisa is a medical student who later becomes a doctor at a hospital. She has a tendency to be bossy and short-tempered, especially around her roommate Traycee, and has a habit of taking endlessly when she is nervous. She once forces Traycee to leave the apartment after an argument, but after her crazy-professional wrestling-fan new roommate scares her, she patches things up with Traycee and moves back in with her, with help from her friends. She eventually forms a relationship with Scott.
 Alexandra "Alex" Kaufman (Suzanne Davis; Season 2 only) – A lifeguard who comes to town after Stads' departure. Alex loves Malibu and hanging out with her friends. She becomes fond of Murray and even tries her hand at a singing career.

Episodes

Season 1 (1998–1999)

Season 2 (1999–2000)

Production staff

Directors
Gary Shimokawa

Writers
Brett Dewey
Mark J. Gordon
Carl Kurlander
Mark Lavine
Renee Palyo
Troy Searer
Bob Underwood

Producers
Chris Conte .... co-executive producer
Brett Dewey .... producer
Leslie Eberhard .... consulting producer
Peter Engel .... executive producer
Carl Kurlander .... co-executive producer
Gil Lopez .... associate producer
Renee Palyo .... supervising producer
Troy Searer .... producer
Tony Soltis .... consulting producer
Shannon Stapleton .... associate producer
Shannon Stapleton .... co-producer

Stations
The series was cleared 88% of the country, and was scheduled to air in 150 markets.

References

External links
 

1998 American television series debuts
2000 American television series endings
1990s American teen sitcoms
2000s American teen sitcoms
1990s American sitcoms
2000s American sitcoms
English-language television shows
First-run syndicated television programs in the United States
Television shows set in Malibu, California
Television series about brothers
Television series about families
Television series about teenagers
Television series about twins
Television series by Universal Television
Television series by Tribune Entertainment